The following lists events that happened during 1991 in Sri Lanka.

Incumbents
President: Ranasinghe Premadasa
Prime Minister: Dingiri Banda Wijetunga 
Chief Justice: Parinda Ranasinghe then Herbert Thambiah then G. P. S. de Silva

Governors
 Central Province – P. C. Imbulana 
 North Central Province – E. L. Senanayake
 North Eastern Province – Nalin Seneviratne 
 North Western Province – Montague Jayawickrama 
 Sabaragamuwa Province – Noel Wimalasena
 Southern Province – Leslie Mervyn Jayaratne
 Uva Province – Abeyratne Pilapitiya 
 Western Province – Suppiah Sharvananda

Chief Ministers
 Central Province – W. M. P. B. Dissanayake 
 North Central Province – G. D. Mahindasoma 
 North Western Province – Gamini Jayawickrama Perera 
 Sabaragamuwa Province – Abeyratne Pilapitiya 
 Southern Province – M. S. Amarasiri 
 Uva Province – Percy Samaraweera
 Western Province – Susil Moonesinghe

Events
 The First Battle of Elephant Pass took place on July 1991 for the purpose of controlling the Sri Lankan military base of Elephant Pass, which was of strategic importance as it was attached to the northern mainland known as Wanni with the Jaffna Peninsula.
 The UNP Minister of Defense, Ranjan Wijeratne, is killed in a car bomb. The LTTE is supposedly responsible for it.
 The South Asian Games are held in Colombo.

Notes 

a.  Gunaratna, Rohan. (1998). Pg.353, Sri Lanka's Ethnic Crisis and National Security, Colombo: South Asian Network on Conflict Research.

References